Pine Ridge is an unincorporated community in Wolfe County, Kentucky, United States.  It lies along Route 15 northwest of the city of Campton, the county seat of Wolfe County.  Its elevation is 1,266 feet (386 m).  The community has a ZIP code of 41360.

References

Unincorporated communities in Wolfe County, Kentucky
Unincorporated communities in Kentucky